Disney's Contemporary Resort, originally to be named Tempo Bay Hotel and previously the Contemporary Resort Hotel, is a resort located at the Walt Disney World Resort in Bay Lake, Florida. Opened on October 1, 1971, the hotel is one of two original properties located at the complex alongside Disney's Polynesian Village Resort, and is currently listed as a deluxe-priced resort. It is adjacent to the Magic Kingdom theme park, and is identified by its A-frame main building.

History
The Contemporary Resort is one of two resorts located on property when Walt Disney World opened in 1971.

The Contemporary Tower, the most prominent of the resort's three stand-alone buildings, was built as an A-frame with outer walls which slope inwards around an inner atrium. This design was a collaboration by Disney, the United States Steel Corporation, and Xerox Tower architect Welton Becket. To construct the building, steel frames were erected on-site and modular pre-constructed rooms, designed by California architect Donald Wexler, were lifted into place by crane. Most of Disney's Polynesian Village Resort and the Court of Flags Resort were built the same way, except rooms were stacked instead of slid in.

In 2006, Disney filed plans for a project on the site of the Contemporary Resort's North Garden Wing. Bay Lake Tower ultimately contained 281 timeshare units. In preparation for the future sale, Disney incorporated a condominium association for the property on January 9, 2007, that would manage the units. The project was officially unveiled on September 16, 2008. Timeshares began on September 28, 2008, to existing Disney Vacation Club members and on October 5, 2008, for new members.

In 2005, Disney began an extensive renovation of the Contemporary Resort, and it was completed in 2009. As part of the construction, the North Garden Wing of the hotel was demolished to make way for a separate Disney Vacation Club resort that opened in 2009. At the same time, the Bay Lake Tower began construction. Disney's Racquet Club was demolished by January 30, 2007, while the North Wing itself was demolished between January 31 and April 6, 2007. Construction on the new building continued through 2007, without Disney announcing what was actually being built. The Bay Lake Tower opened in 2009.

Richard Nixon's 1973 press conference

On November 17, 1973, the Contemporary was the site of what would become one of the most famous press conference statements in modern American politics, where President Richard Nixon declared, "I am not a crook." Nixon, whose job approval rating had been declining steadily for over a year due to the on-going Watergate scandal, made the statement during an appearance at the Associated Press Managing Editors Association annual convention, at which he held a live one-hour televised press conference. Following an earlier question on Nixon's taxes, Nixon addressed claims that he profited from his public service, stating "I've earned every cent. And in all of my years of public life I have never obstructed justice ... People have got to know whether or not their President is a crook. Well, I am not a crook. I've earned everything I've got." Less than one year later, facing almost certain impeachment and removal from office, Nixon announced his resignation on August 8, 1974, which became effective the following day.

Layout

Main building

Rooms and facilities
The Contemporary Tower houses most of the resort's key facilities, including resort registration and the guest service concierge. The main hall, named the Grand Canyon Concourse, is located in the main tower and houses restaurants and shops. 383 guest rooms line the outer walls of the Contemporary Tower. The Walt Disney World Monorail System runs through the inside of this building and a monorail station is located here for resort guests. Adorning the concourse walls is a multi-story mosaic designed by Mary Blair. One three-story wing flanks the south side of the tower and houses an additional 250 rooms. In October 2007, the resort received designation as part of the Florida Green Lodging Program.

In June 2021, Disney Parks Blog announced the rooms had undergone a redesign blending monorail motifs with Incredibles characters.

Dining
There are several restaurants in the Contemporary Resort's main building. The California Grill is a full-service dining restaurant located at the top (15th floor) of the Contemporary Resort's tower, formerly the Top of the World restaurant. A second full-service restaurant, Steakhouse 71, is located on the first floor of the main tower in a space formerly occupied by The Wave ... of American Flavors and, before that, the Fiesta Fun Center arcade. Its theming and name are both inspired by the resort's opening year, 1971. Two restaurants, a character buffet (Chef Mickey's) and a quick-service facility (Contempo Café), are located on the Grand Canyon Concourse in the main tower's atrium, with coffee bars and lounges located throughout the resort complex.

Bay Lake Tower

Bay Lake Tower at Disney's Contemporary Resort, part of the Disney Vacation Club, is a 15-story addition that officially opened on August 4, 2009. It is located on the former location of the demolished North Garden Wing rooms. The tower shares design features with the original resort. The front desk, concierge, valet, bell services and transportation are shared services provided through the main resort.  Bay Lake Tower has a concierge desk and an online check-in desk of their own for guests who wish to check into Bay Lake Tower directly. Its fifth floor is connected by a skyway from the main tower's fourth floor.

The units were among the most expensive offered by Disney Vacation Club at initial offering, presumably because of their proximity to the Magic Kingdom. Some of the resort's features include full-length windows with views into the Magic Kingdom or onto Bay Lake. Some bathrooms on the Magic Kingdom side include movable partitions to permit watching the park's fireworks displays from the bathtub.

Incidents

On November 12, 1992, an off-duty Cast Member fell off the ledge outside the Top of The World restaurant on the 15th floor of the Contemporary. The cast member had been sitting on the ledge when a swarm of wasps appeared; while trying to swat the wasps away, the cast member lost his balance and fell to his death eleven stories below.
On March 22, 2016, a person died at Disney's Contemporary Resort. According to multiple sources, the person jumped to their death inside the central A-frame tower.
On May 28, 2018, an intoxicated man was arrested at Disney's Contemporary Resort after he falsely told other guests an active shooter was in the resort. Panic soon followed and the resort was placed on lockdown until police could arrive. The reports were traced back to the man, who was found hiding in bushes outside of the resort. When questioned, the man claimed that his motive was to get reactions from people for a class and his YouTube channel.

References

External links 
 

Contemporary Resort
Buildings and structures completed in 1971
Convention centers in Florida
Hotels established in 1971
Modernist architecture in Florida
A-frame houses and buildings
Welton Becket buildings
Disney Vacation Club
Hotel buildings completed in 2009
Hotels established in 2009
1971 establishments in Florida